The Nandom Senior High is a Catholic secondary school for boys, located in Nandom, in the Nandom district of the Upper West Region in Ghana. The school was formerly called St. Michael's Secondary School.

History 
The school was founded in 1968 by the Friars of Immaculate conception (FIC) brothers with an initial number of 38 students and this has risen to 858 in recent periods.

Nandom Senior High School, also known as NANSEC, has enjoyed some glories especially in the period of General Certificate of Education (GCE) Ordinary and Advanced levels. This is evident in the year 1976 when the school witnessed outstanding results.

Headmasters 
 Rev. Bro. Albert  Ketelaars
 Rev. Bro. Nicholas Zumana
 Guo Kilian Popyin
 Rev. Bro. Joachim Naah

Notable alumni 

 Charles A. Abugre, chief executive officer of the Savannah Accelerated Development Authority
 Ahmed Bening, deputy secretary-general of the Panafrican Youth Union
 Emmanuel Bombande, Chairperson on The Truth, Justice and Reconciliation Commission of Kenya
 W. Jacob Kor, Director-General of the Ghana Education Service (GES).
 Benjamin Kunbuor, Ghanaian politician 
 D.D. Kuupole, Vice Chancellor of the University of Cape Coast
 Justice Gabriel Pwamang, Supreme Court Judge
 Amin Amidu Sulemana, Ghanaian diplomat and politician
 Joseph Akanjolenur Whittal, Commissioner of the Commission on Human Rights and Administrative Justice

References 

Boys' schools in Ghana
Educational institutions established in 1968
1968 establishments in Ghana
Upper West Region
Catholic secondary schools in Ghana